Rainmaker is YFriday's debut album. Released in 1999 before the band went full-time the album contains the well known track "Holy, Holy, Holy".

Track listing
 Shine (4:07)
 Holy, Holy, Holy (3:55)
 Closer (4:37)
 Part of Me (4:44)
 Thank You for the Cross (4:42)
 Rainmaker (2:11)
 All over the World (4:08)
 Greatest (4:19)
 If (4:24)
 Calling Out (3:21)
 Here (5:54)

Personnel
Ken Riley - vocals and guitars
Gav Richards - keyboards, guitars & backing vocals
Ben Culkin - bass guitar
Dez Minto - drums

1999 albums
Survivor Records albums
YFriday albums